The Tamaulipan woodrat (Neotoma angustapalata) is a species of rodent in the family Cricetidae.
It is found only in Mexico.

References

Musser, G. G. and M. D. Carleton. 2005. Superfamily Muroidea. pp. 894–1531 in Mammal Species of the World a Taxonomic and Geographic Reference. D. E. Wilson and D. M. Reeder eds. Johns Hopkins University Press, Baltimore.

Tamaulipan Woodrat
Endemic mammals of Mexico
Tamaulipan Woodrat
Tamaulipan Woodrat
Taxonomy articles created by Polbot
Veracruz moist forests